Rudbeck is a surname. Notable people with the surname include:

Olaus Rudbeck (1630–1702), Swedish scientist and writer, professor of medicine at Uppsala University, son of Bishop Johannes Rudbeck of Vasteras
Olof Rudbeck the Younger (1660–1740), Swedish explorer and scientist, son of Olaus Rudbeck Sr., ennobled 1719 by Queen Ulrika Eleanora.
Johannes Rudbeck (1581–1646), bishop at Västerås, Sweden, from 1619 until his death

sv:Rudbeck